The Holocaust has been compared to the Nakba. The appropriateness and nature of this comparison is widely debated.

Historical relation
Prior to the Holocaust, Zionists had opposed founding an ethnocentric Jewish state, but this changed rapidly in the 1940s. David Ben-Gurion changed his view on Arab self-determination, deciding that it could not be allowed in a Jewish state. In one of his speeches addressing the Biltmore Program, he stated that after the Holocaust, "do we not have the right this time to demand rectification for our historical indignity, for the discrimination that all the nations have committed against us, and to demand that they give us the same status as all the other nations?" In 1947 and 1948, 700,000 Palestinians—80 percent of the territory's Arab population—fled or were expelled from the territory that became Israel. Both during the Holocaust and the Nakba, there was large-scale looting of the property of the victims.

In 1949, the Polish–Jewish Holocaust survivors Genya and Henryk Kowalski arrived in Israel. They were offered a formerly Palestinian house in Jaffa, but refused to move in. Genya Kowalski later explained, "it reminded us how we had to leave the house and everything behind when the Germans arrived and threw us into the ghetto... I did not want to do the same thing that the Germans did." Their choice to refuse looted Palestinian property was exceptional.

In contrast to the Holocaust, which ended, the Nakba is still ongoing.

In discussions of the Israeli–Palestinian conflict, the Holocaust and the Nakba have come to be regarded as interrelated events, both historically and in the way these two tragedies have influenced perceptions of the conflict by both parties.

Historiography
The Holocaust is a universalized memory in Western culture and has tended to block out the memory of the Nakba. According to Nina Fischer, both events "function as cultural traumas and are central to the collective memory and identity of the two peoples". Both the Hebrew word for Holocaust, Shoah, and Nakba translate as "catastrophe".

Israel
In Israel, all Israeli Jews are considered survivors of the Holocaust who must implement the imperative of never again in regards to being a Jewish victim. The uniqueness of the Holocaust is emphasized, non-Jewish victims of Nazi Germany are sidelined, and any linkage between the Holocaust and the Nakba is rejected. 

According to Zionist historiography, the formation of the State of Israel in 1948 was the "culmination of the long Jewish quest for rights and justice". Israeli historian Benny Morris argues that the Zionist fighters were motivated by the Holocaust, among other factors. The Israeli view of the 1948 Arab–Israeli war holds that Israel had "no alternative" in the war and fought with purity of arms. The mainstream view in Israel is that Arabs left the country voluntarily in response to calls from the Arab leadership, although in the twenty-first century more diverse views have been expressed. The Israeli statehas   made an effort to erase the memory of the Nakba, destroying Palestinian villages and avoiding mentioning the issue in history books. While some Israelis acknowledge a tragedy while denying Zionist responsibility for it, others proclaim the Nakba a myth and "a collection of tall tales".

Portrayal of Arabs as Nazis is common in the discourse of the Arab–Israeli conflict, as is depicting Palestinian anti-Zionism as motivated by antisemitism. According to Joseph A. Massad, "Israel's insistence on its vulnerability reflected a conscious strategy". The 1961 trial of Holocaust perpetrator Adolf Eichmann was an opportunity to connect Arabs to Nazis. The descriptive Nazification of the Palestinian people was a hallmark of the policy of Menachem Begin's Likud Party. The height of this phenomenon occurred in 2015 when Israeli Prime Minister Benjamin Netanyahu falsely accused the Palestinian Amin al-Husseini of starting the Holocaust.

Many Israelis argue that the Holocaust and the Nakba cannot be compared. According to Shira Stav, one flaw with Israeli representations that attempt to bridge this gap is the absence of Palestinian voices and the tendency to present Israeli soldiers as traumatized victims. According to a paper by Israeli Holocaust, conflict and peace researcher Dan Bar-On and Rutgers professor Saliba Sarsar, it was only at the turn of the 21st century Israeli Jewish and Palestinian intellectuals "found the courage" to bridge the gap, conceptually, between the Holocaust and the Nakba. On the Israeli–Jewish side, Bar-On and Sarsar cite Ilan Gur-Zeev and Ilan Pappé's 2003 paper Beyond the Destruction of the Other's Collective Memory: Blueprints for a Palestinian-Israeli Dialogue as an early call for the Holocaust and the Nakba "to be examined within a mutual context", that highlighted, without claiming equivalence, "the thread that ties them to the collective psyche of both people".

Germany
After the 1952 Reparations Agreement with Germany, Moshe Sharett suggested paying some of the reparations money to Palestinian refugees. This was rejected because it would have meant linking the Holocaust and the Nakba. Ian S. Lustick argues that the Reparations Agreement could serve as a model for a future Israeli–Palestinian peace deal. Lustick argues additionally that "if reconciliation has been possible between Israel and Germany, it cannot be said to be impossible for Israel and Palestine".

Germany's criticism in the 1970s of Israel's unilateral border changes and settlement policies in the Palestinian territories it had occupied, influenced in part, it has been argued, the De facto annexation of Jerusalem in July 1980 with the Jerusalem Law.  This may also have been a response to the Venice Declaration a month earlier, in June, when the European Economic Community recognized the right of Palestinians to self-determination and to participate in peace negotiations. A harsh official Israeli communiqué branded the latter as a second Munich (where European powers acknowledged the German Annexation of Sudetenland): Palestinians were framed as regenerated Nazis and Europeans favorable to their cause likened to Neville Chamberlain. When West Germany eventually moved towards recognition of the PLO and the Palestinian right to self-determination in the 1980s, Israel retaliated by again bringing up the Nazi past.

Daniel Marwecki argues that in the twenty-first century, the German "Staatsräson  means viewing the Israel-Palestine conflict through the lens of German Holocaust memory", but the majority of Germans do not share this perspective.

Palestine
In contrast, Palestinian writers draw a direct connection from the Holocaust to the Nakba and see themselves as the ultimate victim of the Nazis.
On the Palestinian side, Bar-On and Sarsar credit Azmi Bishara (1996), Edward Said (1997) and Naim Ateek (2001) as early pioneers of the notion of connecting Palestinian acknowledgement of the Holocaust to Israeli Jewish recognition of the Nakba. In his 1992 work Between Place and Space, Bishara is quoted as arguing: "In order for the victim to forgive, he must be recognized as a victim. That is the difference between a historic compromise and a cease-fire." In an essay, Said criticized the use of comparisons between the two events as a means of delegitimizing the other side or justifying present-day violence and oppression. He stated that connecting the Holocaust to the Nakba was "understanding what is universal about a human experience under calamitous conditions. It means compassion, human sympathy, and utter recoil from the notion of killing people for ethnic, religious, or nationalist reasons".

One response in Palestine and the Arab world to the Western view of the Holocaust as the ultimate evil is Holocaust denial. According to Israeli sociologist Sammy Smooha, Holocaust denial by Palestinians is a kind of protest "to express strong objection to the portrayal of the Jews as the ultimate victim and to the underrating of the Palestinians as a victim". According to Gilbert Achcar, Israel especially and other Western countries to a lesser extent underestimate Arab expressions of sympathy for Holocaust victims.

International perspectives
Raphael Lemkin, the inventor of the concept of genocide, supported Zionism and likely considered the Nakba justified in line with mainstream Zionist views. Although he championed the independence of "small nations", especially the Jews, Lemkin did not believe in granting independence to groups, such as Palestinian Arabs, that he thought were not sufficiently developed to qualify as nations. In his 2021 book The Problems of Genocide, historian A. Dirk Moses argues that the universalization of the Holocaust in the definition of genocide has served to exclude other acts—including the Nakba—from moral opprobrium. Moses writes, "Today, this regime ascribes Palestinians the role of the villains in a global drama about preventing genocide and a 'second Holocaust' for resisting colonization of and expulsion from their land."

Some historians such as Moses and Donald Bloxham have criticized the perceived uniqueness of the Holocaust, and instead view it and the Nakba as part of broader trends of settler colonialism and ethnic nationalism leading to genocide and ethnic cleansing in the European rimlands. There is a general consensus that colonialism is a valuable frame of analysis for Nazism and the Holocaust. Historian Omer Bartov writes that various competing nationalisms in east-central Europe excluded Jews. Their negative treatment by non-Jewish neighbors during and after the Holocaust "by all accounts... rendered many of them indifferent and callous and at times vengeful toward the Arab population they encountered in Palestine".

Literature

Some Israeli–Jewish writers have addressed both the Holocaust and Nakba in their work. As early as 1949, in his novella Hirbet Hiz‘ah S. Yizhar dealt with the expulsion of Palestinians by Israeli forces, the narrator directly comparing the plight of Palestinian refugees to that of Jewish refugees. In an interview, Yizhar explained that the action of expelling Palestinians contradicted his earlier beliefs about what Zionism would be. In a letter, Israeli minister of agriculture Aharon Zisling expressed his revulsion at the al-Dawayima massacre, stating: "Nazi acts have been committed by Jews as well". In 1952, Avot Yeshurun published the poem "Passover on Caves" in Haaretz, he later explained the poem: "The Holocaust of European Jewry and the Holocaust of Palestinian Arabs, a single Holocaust of the Jewish People. The two gaze directly into one another's face." These few dissenting responses came soon after the Nakba, when the Holocaust also was a recent event.

In 1969 the Palestinian novelist Ghassan Kanafani published a novel, Return to Haifa in which a Palestinian couple who had fled Haifa during the nakba, return to their home city, and encounter a Jewish couple – the husband is a Holocaust survivor- who, on finding their empty home, occupied it and raised the young boy they found there as a Jew. This son of the Palestinian couple, Dov, is engaged in military service with the IDF, while their other son in Ramallah has joined the PLO's fedayeen. The novel explores the tensions that arise from the interactions of these two traumatically displaced families.

Lebanese novelist Elias Khoury's epic novel Bab Al-Shams (Gate of the Sun), originally published in 1998, tells the history of Palestine.

Palestinian-American writer Susan Abulhawa's bestselling novel Mornings in Jenin (2010) covers the history of a Palestinian family from the 1930s until 2002. Although the book portrays anti-Arab racism and settler colonialism, it also engages with the Holocaust. The novel's protagonists are a Jewish couple who are Holocaust survivors and a Palestinian couple displaced by the Nakba. The latter have one child, David, who is separated from his parents and adopted by the Jewish couple who are infertile. David later fights against his younger Palestinian brothers after the 1967 war during the Israeli occupation of the West Bank. By the third generation, the families achieve reconciliation with some of them living together in the United States.

The Warsaw Ghetto boy, an iconic image of the Holocaust, has been used in comparisons with the Israeli–Palestinian conflict, especially in the award-winning film Waltz with Bashir.

The 2018 book The Holocaust and the Nakba makes the case that "unless we can hold these two moments in our hearts and minds as part of the same story, there can be no moving forward in the seemingly unmovable conflict that is Israel-Palestine".

Consequences
Hannah Arendt wrote that the formation of Israel solved the Jewish question in Europe, but "merely produced a new category of refugees, the Arabs, thereby increasing the number of stateless". She criticized the way that Jewish historians had portrayed Jews "not [as] history-makers but history-sufferers, preserving a kind of eternal identity of goodness whose monotony was disturbed only by the equally monotonous chronicle of persecutions and pogroms". In her view, this perception of Jewish history allowed the Holocaust and the Arab–Israeli conflict to be presented as parts of a continuum of persecution of Jews.

According to Bashir Bashir and Amos Goldberg "a joint Arab-Jewish public deliberation on the traumatic memories of these two events is not only possible, however challenging and disruptive it may be, but also fundamental for producing an egalitarian and inclusive ethics of binationalism in Israel/Palestine".

Elias Khoury states that "The Holocaust and the Nakba are not mirror images, but the Jew and the Palestinian are able to become mirror images of human suffering if they disabuse themselves of the delusion of exclusionist, national ideologies." He views setting aside these ideologies as part of a universal struggle against racism.

Citations

Sources

Further reading

The Holocaust
History of the Palestinian refugees